The 2022 Alamo Bowl was a college football bowl game held on December 29, 2022, at the Alamodome in San Antonio, Texas. The 30th annual Alamo Bowl, the game featured the Texas Longhorns from the Big 12 Conference and the Washington Huskies from the Pac-12 Conference. The game began at 8:10 p.m. CST and aired on ESPN. It was one of the 2022–23 bowl games concluding the 2022 FBS football season. Sponsored by Valero Energy, the game was officially known as the Valero Alamo Bowl.

Teams
The game featured Texas from the Big 12 and Washington from the Pac-12. Both teams entered the bowl ranked in all major polls. This was the fifth meeting between the programs; entering the bowl, Texas led the all-time series, 3–1, as Washington's lone win came in the 1979 Sun Bowl.

Texas Longhorns

Texas played to a 8–4 regular-season record, 6–3 in conference play. They were ranked as high as No. 18 during the season. The Longhorns faced four ranked opponents, defeating Kansas State while losing to Alabama, Oklahoma State, and TCU. Texas entered the bowl 20th in the College Football Playoff (CFP) ranking.

Washington Huskies

Washington completed their regular season with a 10–2 record, 7–2 in conference play. Their only losses came in back-to-back contests against UCLA and Arizona State. The Huskies faced, and defeated, three ranked opponents: Michigan State, Oregon State, and Oregon. Washington entered the bowl 12th in the CFP ranking.

Game summary

Statistics

References

Alamo Bowl
Alamo Bowl
Texas Longhorns football bowl games
Washington Huskies football bowl games
Alamo Bowl
Alamo Bowl